Boyzvoice was a fictional Norwegian boy band, best known from the movie Get Ready to be Boyzvoiced (2000). They consisted of three band members: brothers M*Pete (Espen Eckbo), Hot Tub (Øyvind Thoen), and Roar Lund-Bergseter (Kaare Daniel Steen).

Boyzvoice was originally formed by Norwegian comedians/actors Espen Eckbo and Henrik Elvestad with the purpose to make fun of boy bands and the commercial music industry. Boyzvoice first appeared on a late-night Norwegian talk-show in 1999 and the same year they climbed the charts in Norway with their Christmas single Let Me Be Your Father X-mas, but Verdens Gang took the song as sincere and described it as a "cliche orgasm" that couldn't be taken seriously, before rating it at one of six.

In Get Ready to be Boyzvoiced, a mockumentary about their lives, first released in 2000, they have to overcome a scandal involving lip-synching over recordings made by session musicians, which results in their being dropped by their record company — reminiscent of the real-life incident involving Milli Vanilli. The scandal is further fed by their manager Timothy Dahle (Henrik Elvestad) physically assaulting two elderly members of the Salvation Army at a charity concert, and the discovery that lead-singer M*Pete's 16-year-old girlfriend (Ida Thorkildsen Valvik) lied about her age and is in fact only 12.

External links
 Boyzvoice.com – Boyzvoice Fansite

Fictional musical groups
Norwegian boy bands
Fictional Norwegian people